The 1977 European Amateur Boxing Championships  were held in Halle, East Germany from 28 May to 5 June. The 22nd edition of the bi-annual competition was organised by the European governing body for amateur boxing, EABA. There were 146 fighters from 23 countries participating.

Medal winners

Medal table

External links
Results
Amateur Boxing

European Amateur Boxing Championships
Boxing
European Amateur Boxing Championships
Boxing
International boxing competitions hosted by Germany
Sport in Halle (Saale)